Seven Lakes is an abandoned, historical populated place in Teller County, Colorado on the Pikes Peak mountain. It was once the site of the Seven Lakes Hotel along a carriage road to the summit of Pikes Peak. Its waters flow from Beaver Creek to the Lake Moraine reservoir, a supplier of water to Colorado Springs.

History

Seven Lakes Park was a horse shoe basin nearly enclosed by Bald Mountain's (generally now called Almagre Mountain) walls. In the late 1870s a wagon road from Colorado City (now Old Colorado City) to Jones Park was extended to Seven Lakes. From there it was about five mile hike to the top of Pikes Peak. In 1889 the carriage road was completed from Seven Lakes to the Pikes Peak summit. Another route could be taken in 1904 on the Colorado Springs and Cripple Creek District Railway (Short Line) to the Clyde station. It was about  via trails and the carriage road to Seven Lakes.

In 1880, Mayo G. Smith bought the Seven Lakes Park property and ran the hotel from 1882 to 1883. It was visited in 1887 by the Boyden Expedition of Harvard College who took atmospheric measurements of Seven Lakes and Pikes Peak. The hotel was expanded to several stories and fitted with a billiard room and bowling alley, and burned down in the 1880s. Visitors came to the area to camp and fish. The Pike's Peak and Seven Lakes Toll Road Company was established by 1890.

Railway lines
In 1896 the Colorado Springs & Cripple Creek Short Line company planned to build a railway branch through Seven Lakes to Pikes Peak. In 1909, the mode of transportation into Seven Lakes was via horses.

The Seven Lakes–Pike's Peak Railway Company was formed in the fall of 1901 to build an  electric trolley line from Clyde to Pikes Peak through Seven Lakes. It was expected to be completed within a year at the cost of $250,000. Henry C. Hall was one of the company's railroad directors. Hall made a proposal during a citizens meeting in the Colorado Springs council chambers in August 1901 regarding water at Seven Lakes. He asked for a review of the use of Seven Falls as a source of water for the city. He claimed it would be an expensive investment, but might not provide as much water as anticipated.

Seven Lakes water supply

Background
The seven natural lakes formed by glaciers were: Isoetes Lake, Lake of the Rocks, Marsh Lake, Michigan Lake, Mirror Lake, Ramona Lake, and Ribbon Lake.

The city of Colorado Springs purchased Seven Lakes land for $70,000 in 1891. That year they built the Lake Moraine Dam. An injunction to prevent the City of Colorado Springs from paying for and receiving title to the Seven Lakes property was refused in January 1902.

Reservoirs built
In 1905, the Mason and McReynolds reservoirs were built in the Seven Lakes area. Marsh, Ribbon, and Mirror Lakes were used to make one of the reservoirs and another reservoir was formed in the Seven Lakes area. Water from the two reservoirs flows through the St. John tunnel to Lake Moraine. In 1909, the City of Colorado Springs restricted access to McReynolds and Mason Reservoirs (Seven Lakes), a source of the municipality's water, which closed off transportation opportunities through that area.

Closed since the 1900s, the two South Slope Recreation Area reservoirs were opened for fishing in 2014, subject to a reservation with the City of Colorado Springs and a Colorado fishing license.

Notes

References

External links

1877 establishments in Colorado
Former populated places in Teller County, Colorado
Pikes Peak
Former populated places in Colorado